E3 ubiquitin-protein ligase Topors is an enzyme that in humans is encoded by the TOPORS gene.

References

Further reading

External links